The Ship (Italian: La Nave) is a 1921 Italian silent historical drama film directed by Gabriellino D'Annunzio and Mario Roncoroni and starring Ida Rubinstein, Alfredo Boccolini, and Ciro Galvani. It is an adaptation of the play La Nave by Gabriele D'Annunzio, father of the film's director.

Cast
 Ida Rubinstein as Basiliola 
 Alfredo Boccolini as Marco Gràtico 
 Ciro Galvani as Sergio Gràtico 
 Mary Cleo Tarlarini as La diaconessa Ema 
 Mario Mariani as Il monaco Traba

Story
Basilioa is the daughter of Orso Faledro and is back in town in search of revenge for her father and for her brothers. The cause of the ruin of her relatives are the Graticis, a rival family. So she pretends to fall in love with both of the Gratici brothers, Marco and Sergio, pushing the two to fight to the death for the love of her. Mario is the winner, but finally he understands that he and his brother have fallen into the seductive trap of Basilioa. Mario is a tribune and uses his power to condemn the woman to the same punishment of her father Orso Faledro: blinding; but Basilioa prefers death in the flames. In the meantime barbarians are coming to the doors of the town; the people move away to found another city: Venice.

References

Bibliography 
 Geoffrey Nowell-Smith. The Oxford History of World Cinema. Oxford University Press, 1996.

External links 
 

1921 films
1920s historical films
Italian historical films
Italian silent feature films
1920s Italian-language films
Films directed by Mario Roncoroni
Films directed by Gabriellino D'Annunzio
Seafaring films
Italian black-and-white films
Films based on works by Gabriele D'Annunzio
Silent adventure films
1920s Italian films